"Fous ta cagoule" is a 2006 song by comedy rap character Fatal Bazooka, the 1st single from album T'as vu released on 2007. This song achieved a huge success in France and Belgium.

Background and writing
The group transposes the urban style into the setting of the snow-covered mountains of Savoy, and caricatures certain French rappers there. The music video was produced by Nicolas Benamou.

The single peaked at #1 in France in January 2007. As of August 2014, the song was the 31st best-selling single of the 21st century in France, with 488,500 units sold.

Description
Two rappers are cold while in the French department of Savoy. To avoid getting sick, they put a ski mask on and advise others to follow suit.

See also
List of number-one hits of 2006 (France)
Ultratop 40 number-one hits of 2006

References
 A sequence of the song shows a man sitting on the toilet, suffering from gastro-enteritis because of the cold. It is a parody of the French slammer Grand Corps Malade. It starts with "I would like to throw out a slam on this disease…" (reference to its Saint-Denis song) and finishes by "the next time, I will put on my hoodie." (reference to his song Les Voyages en train which finishes by "next time, you'll take the bus.") This character reappears in the song Crêpes au froment and it is named there "Large Sick Bottom".
 Another sequence shows rappers from Marseille. One starts to quickly sing nonsense with a very strong Marseille accent. He is called "Fonky Profanation", and is a parody of Fonky Family, in particular of the song Bad Boys de Marseille (the passage of the Rat Luciano and Don Choa). Its logorrhée is so incomprehensible that a friend says to him "But Ho, don't you understand; no-one understands what you're saying?" to specify "… it to him is not that, but there is a precise message, you see…" what is supposed to parody the "reasons" for many rappers who say to pass a "message" through their songs sometimes badly received. Profanation Fonky will remake a small appearance in Mauvaise Foi Nocturne and Crêpes au froment.
 The refrain is inspired by the introduction of the song Hardcore by Ideal J, where one hears "Insane your hood already!".
 The piece takes again a sample of Woman to Woman of Joe Cocker (already used by Dr. Dre for Tupac's California Love).
 A sequence at the beginning of the clip shows a thermometer which goes down, parodying the Température clip of Sean Paul (where one sees also a thermometer that rises).
 "Ouais Gros" of the beginning of the song are a reference to group 113, while the "dedications" of the end are current in the pieces of rep.
 The names of the list of dedications are themselves parodies of artists and hip-hop groups ("Pandi-Panda" for Booba, "Pitbull de Flipper" for Pit Baccardi…) One finds a list even more complete of parodies of artists in the song Crêpes au froment.

Cover versions and parodies
This song, by its big hit and its broad diffusion on the music channels and Internet, was the subject of several parodies:

 Christmas 2006, the firemen of the Geneva International Airport turned on the tarmac and in the general headquarter a clip with the song Fous ta cagoule, when their chief was not there. This video, entitled Fatal SA, Fou ta cagoule (also known under Fous ta cagoule, pompier), met a great success on Internet. The men involved in the video were later reprimanded for unauthorized use of fire equipment and degrading the image of the fire department.
 The song was used in a parody video-clip about a Russian city of Perm
 The organizers of the "Morning" of radio operator Le Mouv' have creates a parody of the song, Fous ta capote, at the time of Sidaction 2007.
 At the beginning of 2007, Romano, organizer of radio operator Skyrock which animates at the sides of Difool the Radio Libre the evening and Morning of the morning, carried out a parody of Fous ta cagoule entitled Fous ta perruque in featuring with a listener who had composed the words of this one.
 A true Savoyard group of rap, Posse 33, turned a clip in answer of the tube of Fatal Bazooka: J'fous ma cagoule, where they criticize in particular Michael Youn to make fun of them.
 Fatal Bazooka itself did to a diversion of its own song in the album T'As Vu ?: Crêpes au froment, where the hood is replaced by crepes with wheat of Brittany, to cure the malbouffe.
 In 2008, the song was covered by Gérard Jugnot, Lââm, Michèle Laroque, Marc Lavoine, Nolwenn Leroy, Christophe Maé and Jean-Baptiste Maunier and included in a medley available on Les Enfoirés' album Les Secrets des Enfoirés.
 The song was used at KVN (Russian humour TV show) in 2015.

Track listings
 CD single
 "Fous ta cagoule" (radio edit) — 3:28
 "Fous ta cagoule" (Playmobitch dirty south remix) — 3:07
 "Fous ta cagoule" (extended Dedikass mix) — 5:09
 "Fous ta cagoule" (instrumental mix) — 3:28

 Digital download
 "Fous ta cagoule" (radio edit) — 3:28

Certifications and sales

Charts

References

2006 singles
Michaël Youn songs
French hip hop songs
Ultratop 50 Singles (Wallonia) number-one singles
SNEP Top Singles number-one singles